Blake Baker (born July 10, 1982) is an American football coach and currently the defensive coordinator for the Missouri Tigers. He most recently the linebackers coach at Louisiana State University. He was previously the defensive coordinator at Miami (FL) and Louisiana Tech.

Playing career
Baker was a linebacker at Tulane from 2000 to 2004, redshirting the 2000 season. He played 42 career games, racking up 145 tackles, 14 tackles for loss, and six sacks in his college career.

Coaching career
Baker was hired a graduate assistant at Texas in 2010, working under Longhorns defensive coordinator Manny Diaz. He was hired to be the safeties coach at Arkansas State in 2013 on Bryan Harsin's staff. After Harsin departed to accept the head coaching position at his alma mater Boise State in 2014, Baker was hired to be the Broncos director of player personnel. He spent approximately a month there before accepting an assistant coaching position at Louisiana Tech.

Louisiana Tech
Baker was hired to be the safeties coach at Louisiana Tech in 2014, working once again under Manny Diaz. After Diaz left to accept the defensive coordinator position at Mississippi State, Baker was promoted to defensive coordinator in 2015 and also assumed Diaz's role as the linebackers coach.

Miami (FL) 
Baker was named the defensive coordinator at the University of Miami by head coach Manny Diaz in January 2019.  It was announced in January 2021 that Baker would be retained in his defensive coordinator role at the University of Miami, but he would no longer be responsible for defensive play-calling on gamedays as head coach Manny Diaz will now be taking on that responsibility.

LSU
On January 29, 2021, Baker joined LSU as linebackers coach and co-defensive coordinator. He was only at LSU for one season as he was not retained by Brian Kelly.

Missouri
On January 20, 2022 he was announced as University of Missouri’s safeties coach. Baker had previously coached with Missouri Head Coach Eliah Drinkwitz at Arkansas State University, where Baker served as safeties coach and Drinkwitz served as Co-OC and Running Backs Coach. After a year on the job, Steve Wilks returned to the NFL, and Baker was promoted to defensive coordinator.

References

External links
 Louisiana Tech profile
 Arkansas State profile
 Tulane profile

1982 births
Living people
American football defensive tackles
American football fullbacks
American football linebackers
Arkansas State Red Wolves football coaches
Louisiana Tech Bulldogs football coaches
LSU Tigers football players
Texas Longhorns football coaches
Tulane Green Wave football players
Miami Hurricanes football coaches
Missouri Tigers football coaches
High school football coaches in Texas
Sportspeople from Houston
Players of American football from Houston